Cooksburg is an unincorporated community in Clarion and Forest counties, Pennsylvania, United States. Cooksburg has a post office with ZIP code 16217.

References

Unincorporated communities in Clarion County, Pennsylvania
Unincorporated communities in Forest County, Pennsylvania
Unincorporated communities in Pennsylvania